ReBoot: The Guardian Code is a Canadian teen drama science fiction live-action/CGI-animated television series produced by Mainframe Studios. Originally announced in 2013, the first ten episodes debuted on Netflix worldwide (excluding Canada) on March 30, 2018. YTV aired all twenty episodes from June 4 to July 5, 2018.

Plot 
Four teenaged gamers, who are members of an online game's highest-scoring team, meet in person on their first day at Alan Turing High School. Their enrollment was arranged by Vera, an artificial intelligence who has recruited the team as "Guardians" to physically enter and protect cyberspace. Early in the series, Vera is given a human body and locked out of cyberspace, so she enrolls as an exchange student. The Guardians battle the Sourcerer, a human hacker. Dark code is the Sourcerer's primary weapon against the world's computer systems. After his initial run-in with the Guardians, the Sourcerer reactivates the computer virus named Megabyte, the main antagonist of the original ReBoot, to help him from inside cyberspace.

Cast 
 Guardians, high school students who physically enter cyberspace under pseudonyms to fight viruses and hackers:
 Ty Wood as Austin Carter, a.k.a. Vector, the leader of the team whose color is red and is the son of Adam Carter/Sourcerer.
 Sydney Scotia as Tamra, a.k.a. Enigma, the agility like ninja of the team whose color is yellow.
 Ajay Friese as Parker, a.k.a. Googz, the brains of the team and a hacker in the internet, his color is green.
 Gabriel Darku as Trey Davies, a.k.a. D-Frag, the muscle of the team who is an athlete in the real world and a hulking strong man in cyberspace, his color is blue.
 Hannah Vandenbygaart as V.E.R.A. (Virtual Evolutionary Recombinary Avatar), an artificial intelligence given a human body in the first episode, and the Guardians' leader.
 Bob Frazer as Adam Carter, Austin's father, who became infected by dark code and turned into the Sourcerer, an evil hacker trying to send the world back into the Dark Ages or the early 1900s, before everything was working with computers. He is Megabyte's master.
 Kirsten Robek as Judy Carter, Austin's mother, who is unaware of her son's guardian double life.
 Luvia Petersen as Special Agent Nance, an agent at the Department of Internet Security (DIS), she once threatened Adam Carter into giving up his information in the mainframe. She wishes to weaponize the Guardian tech so DIS can destroy computers of America's enemies.
 Nicholas Lea as Mark Rowan, an agent at the Department of Internet Security and a friend of Adam Carter.
 Timothy E. Brummund as Megabyte (voice), a virus from the original series, is the Sourcerer's servant. Due the fact he is over 20 years out of date, Megabyte was upgraded by the Sourcerer upon reactivation.
 Alex Zahara as the Alpha Sentinels (voice), Megabyte's lead minion at any given time. Megabyte destroys one an episode even if they carry out his orders flawlessly.
 Shirley Millner as Hexadecimal (voice), a virus from the original series and Megabyte's sister, who was later imprisoned by the guardians to Viruslym, she was later freed by Megabyte. Unlike her brother, Hex is chaos incarnate and wishes to turn cyberspace upside down.

Episodes

Season 1 (YTV) (2018)

Season 1 (Netflix) (2018)

Season 2 (Netflix) (2018)

Development 
On October 3, 2013, Rainmaker announced the development of a new ReBoot television series alongside the reintroduction of the Mainframe company brand for its small screen productions. Speaking to Canada.com later that month, Rainmaker's president and Chief Creative Officer Michael Hefferon stated that the show wouldn't be the same as the "world of technology has changed drastically in the 20 years from when ReBoot first started" and cautioned that the original show's characters would likely be limited to cameo appearances. He then said that the company planned to pitch the series in February, with the hope of getting YTV on board as the broadcast partner.

In November 2014, Rainmaker revealed the show would be called ReBoot: The Guardian Code. The following May, Deadline reported the series would be a live-action/CG-animated hybrid distributed by The Weinstein Company. On June 8, 2015, Corus Entertainment, owners of YTV, ordered a 26-episode first season, stating that the series was created by Hefferon and confirming the details of the Deadline story. Shortly after, various characters from the original series, including Bob, Dot, Enzo and Megabyte, were confirmed to appear in the series, though focus had shifted to a group of four teenagers recruited into protecting cyberspace by the Guardian program V.E.R.A. The four teens were named as Austin, Parker, Trey and Tamra. A poster showcasing Austin in his guardian form was released. Commenting on the inclusion of live-action material in the series, Hefferon stated, "I talked with broadcasters around the world. The one [resounding] thing — and I hate to break it to the fans — was nobody wanted the reboot of what [the show originally] was. Nobody was willing to buy it." He later added that two thirds of an average episode would be animated content. At the time, the series was planned for a late 2016/early 2017 launch.

Production 
Casting calls for the series went out in May 2016. They listed a shoot date between August and November of that year in Vancouver, British Columbia, with YTV attached as the broadcast partner and the episode count reduced to 20. Production was delayed with filming taking place in British Columbia in February and March 2017.

On March 28, 2017, Corus confirmed the information revealed in the casting calls and announced the show's executive staff and main cast. Worldwide distribution, licensing, and merchandising rights had moved to Corus's Nelvana Enterprises with YTV set to debut the series in 2018. A mobile virtual reality experience and digital trading card game were confirmed to be in development. Rainmaker's parent company Wow Unlimited Media reported that the first 8 episodes of the series had been delivered to broadcast partners in the third quarter of 2017, with the remaining 12 scheduled for the fourth quarter of that year.

ReBoot: The Guardian Code is modeled, rigged, and animated in Autodesk Maya, and rendered in 4K resolution using Unreal Engine 4. Hefferon stated that using Unreal gave them an advantage in speed: "Some of these shots could have taken 3 to 13 hours in a traditional pipeline, per frame," whereas Unreal rendered each frame in seconds or minutes. It also easily allowed the crew to reuse animation assets for the virtual reality tie-in.

Casting 
Ty Wood, Sydney Scotia, Ajay Parikh-Friese and Gabriel Darku were cast as group of teenagers who enter Mainframe to protect the virtual and real world from viruses such as Megabyte.

Three voice actors from the original series reprise their voice roles in this series: Michael Benyaer returns as Bob, Kathleen Barr as Dot and Shirley Millner as Hexadecimal. Timothy E. Brummund replaces Tony Jay as Megabyte due to the original actor's death in 2006.

Distribution 
A trailer for the series and the virtual reality experience debuted on February 21, 2018. The first ten episodes debuted on Netflix globally, excluding Canada, on March 30, followed by ten more episodes on September 28 as a "second" season.<ref name="TGC on Netflix">{{cite web|website=Netflix|title=ReBoot: The Guardian Code|url=https://www.netflix.com/title/80217957|access-date=September 16, 2018}}</ref> All twenty episodes aired on YTV in Canada between June 4 and July 5.

 Other media 
Following the debut of the show's first 10 episodes on Netflix, the official ReBoot: The Guardian Code YouTube channel uploaded a series of 10 one-minute virtual reality shorts. Similarly, YTV released a series of live-action shorts featuring the characters from the show alongside the Canadian broadcast. A number of these shorts are directly tied to events in the series.

A free-to-play mobile game, titled ReBoot: The Guardian Code – Code Hacker was released for iOS and Android devices on March 22, 2018. Developed by A.C.R.O.N.Y.M. Digital, the game is a match-5 puzzle title that features audio detection technology allowing users watching the YTV broadcast to unlock in-game cards. A web-browser version was also hosted on the official website for the series, as well as on YTV's site. As of January 5, 2022 the mobile game is no longer on the Google Play Store.

 Reception 
 Pre-release 
On February 21, 2018, an official trailer was released. It was not well received; by March 10, 2018, the trailer had reached 12,000 dislikes and 983 likes on YouTube.

On February 25, 2018, the French website Codelyoko.fr, a fansite for the TV show Code Lyoko, published a negative review of the trailer. The review accused ReBoot: The Guardian Code of plagiarizing Code Lyoko, as the trailer showed many similarities to Code Lyokos premise and characters. Shamus Kelley from Den of Geek! also noticed the similarities, claiming that "ReBoot: The Guardian Code is going for the whole Code Lyoko thing" and added that "There isn't a single reference to the old series outside of the term Guardians. It feels more like a teen drama with elements from Code Lyoko and Superhuman Samurai Syber-Squad." Another concurring opinion came from Digital Spy writer Jon Anderton, who claimed that the original show "took place inside a computer system and there was no schoolkid element, making The Guardian Code more similar to 2000's series Code Lyoko (or Tron, to use a more mainstream example)". Shortly after the trailer's release, Code Lyoko co-creator Thomas Romain responded to the official ReBoot: The Guardian Code Twitter account, stating, "Wow you really liked Code Lyoko, didn’t you?" The Guardian Code has also been seen as a derivative of Zixx, an earlier CG/live-action TV show Rainmaker helped produce.

 Release 
Reviewing the first ten episodes of the series for Collider, Dave Trumbore had mixed feelings, giving the show a 2-star rating. While he praised the performance of Hannah Vandenbygaart, the character interactions and most of the visual aesthetic, he felt the show's animation was of poor quality for a 2018 series. He criticized the writing, acting and camerawork, saying that it is "stuck in the mid-'90s." His biggest issue was the show's pacing, commenting that the series took too long to introduce emotional moments and callbacks to the original show.

Emily Ashby awarded the show 3 stars in her review for Common Sense Media. She felt the show had a number of positive role models for kids and while the series wasn't educational in nature, its use of technology could spur interest in STEM fields.

Shamus Kelley of Den of Geek!'' was especially critical of the tenth episode. Describing it as "one of the worst episodes of television" he has ever seen. He derided the decision to include a character mocking fans and felt the cameos from the original characters were superficial. Conversely, io9's Charles Pulliam-Moore found it to be the only episode of the first ten to be worth watching. Calling it "legitimately fantastic," he enjoyed the appearance of characters from the original series and said "you can get away with not watching the rest of the season, jumping to the finale, and actually having a good time."

References

External links 
 

2018 Canadian television series debuts
2018 Canadian television series endings
2010s Canadian teen drama television series
2010s Canadian comic science fiction television series
2010s Canadian high school television series
Canadian action television series
Canadian adventure television series
Canadian drama television series
Canadian teen drama television series
Canadian science fiction television series
Canadian computer-animated television series
Canadian television series with live action and animation
Cyberpunk television series
Space adventure television series
Television series reboots
Television shows about virtual reality
Television shows filmed in Vancouver
 
Teen superhero television series
Television series about teenagers
Television series by Rainmaker Studios
Television shows about video games
YTV (Canadian TV channel) original programming
English-language Netflix original programming